Zapp V (aka Zapp Vibe) is the fifth studio album by Ohio P-Funk band Zapp.

Zapp Vibe became the last full-length album to include frontman Roger Troutman and brother Larry Troutman before their untimely deaths in 1999.

The next full-length album to be released by the band would be in 2002 entitled "Zapp VI: Back by Popular Demand".

Track listing

References

External links
 Zapp V at Discogs

1989 albums
Albums produced by Roger Troutman
Reprise Records albums
Zapp (band) albums